Riders of the Range, was a series of strip cartoons in the British comic, Eagle. It was created by Charles Chilton. The artists who drew this series were Jack Daniel, Angus Scott, Frank Humphris  and Ferdinando Tacconi.

Plot

The heroes of the series, set the American Old West, were straight-talking and straight-shooting Jeff Arnold, and his companion, the older, gruff Luke (surname?). Inseparable partners, the righted wrongs throughout the territory. Once, they very publicly fell out with each other, in order to flush out a gun-for-hire.

History 
The series began as a radio broadcast in 1949.

References 

Western (genre) comics
Eagle comic strips
Eagle (comic) characters
Comics based on radio series
Comic strips started in the 1950s